Harbourmaster is an American adventure/drama series that ran on CBS from September 26, 1957, to December 26, 1957. On January 5, 1958, the series began running on ABC as Adventure at Scott Island, and it ended on June 29, 1958. Harbormaster was a Ziv production.

Synopsis
The series stars Barry Sullivan as captain of the ship The Blue Chip II and the owner of a business that repaired boats. Crime chaser David Scott. Paul Burke appeared in five episodes as Jeff Kittridge, Scott's partner in their boat-repair business. Other recurring roles were filled by Nina Wilcox as Anna Morrison, Michael Keens as Captain Dan, and Evan Elliott as Danny. The program is based in New England about fictional Scott Island near Rockport, Massachusetts.

Harbormaster first aired at 8 p.m. Eastern on CBS on Thursdays, opposite Zorro on ABC and Groucho Marx's You Bet Your Life on NBC. On January 5, 1958, the series switched to Sunday evenings on ABC with the episode "Pirate's Curse" guest starring Lonny Chapman.

R. J. Reynolds Tobacco Company sponsored both versions of the program. Reynolds apparently sought another sponsor to pay for alternate weeks of the CBS broadcasts but ended up as the sole sponsor.

Notable guest stars

Barbara Bain
Michael Conrad
Bruce Gordon
Larry Hagman
Luke Halpin
Will Kuluva
Martin Landau

Ruth McDevitt
Joanna Cook Moore
Suzanne Pleshette
Hugh Reilly
William Smithers
Jud Taylor
David White

References

External links
 
 

1957 American television series debuts
1958 American television series endings
1950s American drama television series
American adventure television series
American Broadcasting Company original programming
Black-and-white American television shows
CBS original programming
English-language television shows
Television series by Ziv Television Programs
Television shows set in Massachusetts